The State Register of Heritage Places is maintained by the Heritage Council of Western Australia. , 57 places are heritage-listed in the Shire of Kellerberrin, of which six are on the State Register of Heritage Places.

List
The Western Australian State Register of Heritage Places, lists the following six state registered places within the Shire of Kellerberrin:

References

Kellerberrin
Kellerberrin